The National Assembly, formerly known as the Chamber of Deputies, is the unicameral legislative branch of the government of Djibouti.

History
The first Assembly of the territory, then a French colony, was from 1946 to 1957 the Representative Council. The framework law of 1956 established a Territorial Assembly, which was replaced in 1967 by the Chamber of Deputies, which remained in office after independence in 1977.

Overview
It consists of 65 members – 30 Somali (21 Issa) and 30 Afar – elected to serve five-year terms in multi-seat (4 to 37 each) constituencies. The first free multi-party parliamentary election since independence (1977) was held in 2003, with the ruling coalition, led by the People's Rally for Progress (RPP), receiving 62.7% of the vote.

Idriss Arnaoud Ali was President of the National Assembly from 2003 until his death in 2015. He was succeeded by Mohamed Ali Houmed.

For its entire existence, the National Assembly has been dominated by the Popular Rally for Progress, which is presently the senior partner in the Union for a Presidential Majority coalition. From 1981 to 1992, the RPP was the sole legal party. Even after opposition parties were legalized in 1992, the RPP won every seat in the legislature. From 1997 onward, it fought elections as part of a coalition, known since 2003 as the UMP, which continued to sweep every seat. Opposition parties did not manage to enter the legislature until 2013. In the 2018 Djiboutian parliamentary election, which was boycotted by the main opposition parties, the Union for the Presidential Majority won a heavy majority. The Djiboutian political system concentrates most power in the president's hands, and there is little opposition to executive decisions.

As of 2018, a quota mandates that at least 25% of the legislators be women.

Presidents

Building 
The building of the national assembly was built and partially financed by the government of Iran and completed on November 23, 2014. The debt for this project has still not been paid to this date. Iranian parliament speaker Ali Larijani attended a ceremony to inaugurate this new building and to hand it over.

References

External links
 

Politics of Djibouti
Djibouti
Djibouti
1977 establishments in Djibouti